Święconka, meaning "the blessing of the Easter baskets", is one of the most enduring and beloved Polish traditions on Holy Saturday during Easter. With roots dating back to the early history of Poland, it is also observed by expatriate and their descendants Poles in the United States, Canada, the United Kingdom, Ireland, Sweden and other Polish communities in the world.

Origins

The tradition of food blessing at Easter, which has early-medieval roots in Christian society, possibly originated from a pagan ritual. The tradition is said to date from the 7th century in its basic form, the more modern form containing bread and eggs (symbols of resurrection and Christ) are said to date from the 12th century.

Modern times

Baskets containing a sampling of Easter foods are brought to church to be blessed on Holy Saturday. The basket is traditionally lined with a white linen or lace napkin and decorated with sprigs of boxwood (bukszpan), the typical Easter evergreen. Poles take special pride in preparing a decorative and tasteful basket with crisp linens, occasionally embroidered for the occasion, and boxwood and ribbon woven through the handle. Observing the creativity of other parishioners is one of the special joys of the event. 

While in some older or rural communities, the priest visits the home to bless the foods, the vast majority of Poles and Polish Americans visit the church on Holy Saturday, praying at the Tomb of the Lord (the fourteenth and final Station of the Cross). The Blessing of the Food is, however, a festive occasion. The three-part blessing prayers specifically address the various contents of the baskets, with special prayers for the meats, eggs, cakes and breads. The priest or deacon then sprinkles the individual baskets with holy water. 

More traditional Polish churches use a straw brush for aspersing the water; others use the more modern metal holy water sprinkling wand. In some parishes, the baskets are lined up on long tables; in others, parishioners process to the front of the altar carrying their baskets, as if in a Communion line. Older generations of Polish Americans, descended from early 19th-century immigrants, tend to bless whole meal quantities, often brought to church halls or cafeterias in large hampers and picnic baskets. 

The foods in the baskets have a symbolic meaning:

 eggs - symbolise life and Christ's resurrection
 bread - symbolic of Jesus
 lamb - represents Christ
 salt - represents purification
 horseradish - symbolic of the bitter sacrifice of Christ
 ham - symbolic of great joy and abundance.

The food blessed in the church remains untouched according to local traditions until either Saturday afternoon or Sunday morning.

See also

 Easter basket
 Easter egg
 Egg decorating in Slavic culture
 Pisanka (Polish)

References

Easter traditions in Poland
Holy Week